Goutevernisse is a commune in the Haute-Garonne department in southwestern France.

Geography
The commune is bordered by four other communes: Rieux-Volvestre to the north, Montesquieu-Volvestre to the east, Saint-Christaud to the south, and finally by Gensac-sur-Garonne to the west.

Population

See also
Communes of the Haute-Garonne department

References

Communes of Haute-Garonne